K-1 Korea MAX 2013 was a kickboxing event promoted by the K-1 in association with the Korean-based promotion Khan Sportainment and Chinese-based promotion Wu Lin Feng. It took place on Feb 2, 2013 at the Olympic Park in Seoul, South Korea. It was the first K-1 event held in Korea since 2010.

References

K-1 events
Kickboxing in South Korea
2013 in kickboxing